Ephyrodes is a genus of moths in the family Erebidae. The genus was erected by Achille Guenée in 1852.

Taxonomy
The genus was previously classified in the family Noctuidae.

Species
Ephyrodes cacata Guenée, 1852 southern US to Colombia, Antilles, Brazil (Pará)
Ephyrodes eviola Hampson, 1926 Peru
Ephyrodes gorgoniopis Dognin, 1919 French Guiana
Ephyrodes hypenoides (Guenée, 1852) French Guiana
Ephyrodes omicron Guenée, 1852 Haiti
Ephyrodes repandens Schaus, 1911 Costa Rica
Ephyrodes similis Druce, 1890 Panama

References

Eulepidotinae
Noctuoidea genera